Georgi Tunjov (born 17 April 2001) is an Estonian professional footballer who plays as a midfielder for  club SPAL.

Club career

SPAL
Tunjov started out playing for hometown team Narva Trans. In March 2018, he joined SPAL academy. Tunjov made his debut in the Serie A on 15 December 2019, coming on as a 73rd-minute substitute in the 1–3 away loss to Roma.
On 13 February 2020 he signed his first professional contract with SPAL, lasting until 30 June 2023.

Loan to Carrarese
In August 2021, Tunjov joined Serie C club Carrarese on a loan deal.

Career statistics

Club

International

References

External links

2001 births
Living people
Sportspeople from Narva
Estonian people of Russian descent
Estonian footballers
Association football midfielders
Meistriliiga players
JK Narva Trans players
Serie A players
Serie B players
Serie C players
S.P.A.L. players
Carrarese Calcio players
Estonian expatriate footballers
Estonian expatriate sportspeople in Italy
Expatriate footballers in Italy
Estonia youth international footballers
Estonia international footballers